Andrew Kaufman (born 1968) is a Canadian writer, film director, and radio producer, best known for novels which incorporate aspects of genre literature, such as fantasy, superhero and detective novels, with humor.

Born and raised in Wingham, Ontario, Kaufman regularly promotes himself as the second most famous and/or second best writer to come from Wingham, as the town was also the birthplace of Alice Munro.

Career
Kaufman was a revolving cast member of the Perpetual Motion Roadshow. 

His debut novella, All My Friends Are Superheroes, was published by Coach House Books in 2003, and is a humorous love story between a normal man and a super-heroine, The Perfectionist. The novella is set in a community of superheroes in Toronto, in which the bizarre characters (The Seeker, The Inverse, BusinessMan etc.) actually personify different human types. A 10th anniversary edition with added bonus material was released in April 2013.

He followed up in 2010 with The Waterproof Bible.

His 2013 book Born Weird was a shortlisted finalist for the Stephen Leacock Memorial Medal for Humour.

His newest novel, The Ticking Heart, was published in 2019. It was shortlisted for the 2020 ReLit Award for fiction.

Bibliography

 All My Friends Are Superheroes (2003)
 The Waterproof Bible (2010)
 The Tiny Wife (2010)
 Born Weird (2013)
 Small Claims (2017)
 The Ticking Heart (2019)

References

Canadian male novelists
Film directors from Ontario
Living people
1968 births
Canadian male screenwriters
21st-century Canadian novelists
People from Wingham, Ontario
Writers from Ontario
21st-century Canadian male writers
Canadian Film Centre alumni
21st-century Canadian screenwriters